Climacograptus is an Ordovician to Silurian genus of graptolites.

References

Graptolite genera
Ordovician animals of North America
Silurian animals of North America
Paleozoic life of Ontario
Bertie Formation
Paleozoic life of New Brunswick
Paleozoic life of Newfoundland and Labrador
Paleozoic life of the Northwest Territories
Paleozoic life of Nunavut
Paleozoic life of Quebec
Paleozoic life of Yukon
Ordovician animals of Asia
Paleozoic Malaysia
Fossils of Malaysia
Fossil taxa described in 1974